Dufouriellus is a monotypic genus of minute pirate bugs now placed in the tribe Anthocorini (previously considered typical of the Dufouriellini). The described species is Dufouriellus ater, which has been recorded from much of western Europe through to Bohemia, Moravia, Slovakia, southern Scandinavia and including the British Isles.

References

Further reading

See also
 List of heteropteran bugs recorded in Britain

External links
 

Cimicomorpha genera
Articles created by Qbugbot
Anthocorini
Hemiptera of Europe